Ephraim Ralph Eckley (December 9, 1811 – March 27, 1908) was an American Civil War veteran and three-term U.S. Representative from Ohio, serving from 1863 to 1869.

Early life
Eckley was born near Mount Pleasant, Jefferson County, Ohio but moved with his parents to Hayesville, Ohio in 1816.

He attended the common schools and was graduated from Vermillion Institute, Hayesville, Ohio. He moved to Carrollton, Ohio in 1833 and taught school.

He studied law under William Johnston and was admitted to the bar in 1836; he commenced practice in Carrollton.

He served as member of the State senate 1843-1846, 1849, and 1850 but was an unsuccessful candidate for Lieutenant Governor of Ohio in 1851. He also served in the State house of representatives 1853-1855 but was an unsuccessful candidate for election in 1853 to the United States Senate.

He served as delegate to the first Republican National Convention at Philadelphia in 1856.

Civil War

During the Civil War, Eckley served in the Union Army as the colonel of the 26th Ohio Infantry, and later of the 80th Ohio Infantry. At the end of the war, he was brevetted as a brigadier general and mustered out of the army.

Postbellum
Eckley was elected as a Republican to the Thirty-eighth, Thirty-ninth, and Fortieth Congresses (March 4, 1863 – March 3, 1869) but was not a candidate for renomination in 1868.

He resumed the practice of law in Carrollton, Ohio. He died March 27, 1908 in Carrollton, Ohio and was interred in Grand View Cemetery.

He married Martha L. Brown and had five children.

See also
Ohio lieutenant gubernatorial elections

References

 Retrieved on 2008-10-12

1811 births
1908 deaths
People from Columbiana County, Ohio
People from Carrollton, Ohio
People of Ohio in the American Civil War
Ohio state senators
Members of the Ohio House of Representatives
Union Army generals
Ohio Whigs
19th-century American politicians
People from Ashland County, Ohio
People from Mount Pleasant, Ohio
Republican Party members of the United States House of Representatives from Ohio